Salvia angulata is a herbaceous perennial native to the Caribbean coast from Panama through Colombia to Venezuela. It grows on the sides of streams and in wet forests, at  elevation.

The  corolla is white, or white tinged with blue.

Notes

angulata
Flora of Colombia
Flora of Panama
Flora of Venezuela